Aed or AED may refer to:

People
 Áed (given name)
 Aed Carabao (Yuenyong Opakul, born 1954), Thai leader of the band Carabao

Science and medicine
 Antiepileptic drug
 Automated external defibrillator
 Atomic-emission detector, in chromatography

Other
 AED Oil Limited
 AED-0, an extended ALGOL 60 used to write DYNAMO II
 Aed (god), an Irish god 
 AED (non-profit oirganisation)
 Advertising elasticity of demand, measuring advertising effectiveness
 Alpha Epsilon Delta (ΑΕΔ), a US premedical honor society
 Argentine Sign Language, ISO 639-3 language code
 United Arab Emirates dirham, by ISO 4217 currency code